Hypercar or variation may refer to:
 Hypercar (concept car)
 Hypercar (car classification), a high-performance supercar
 Le Mans Hypercar

See also
 Hyper (disambiguation)
 Car (disambiguation)
 Supercar (disambiguation)
 Muscle car